Joseph-Ernest Grégoire   (July 31, 1886 – September 17, 1980) was a French Canadian politician.

Background

He was born in Disraeli, Quebec on July 31, 1886.  He was an attorney and a professor. Member of the Barreau du Quebec in 1913, he practised law from 1938 to 1966.

Mayor of Quebec

Grégoire ran for mayor in Quebec City in 1934 and won, defeating Pierre Bertrand. He was reelected in the 1936 election, defeating Lucien Borne. He ran again in the 1938 election, but this time he was defeated by Lucien Borne.

Member of the legislature

He was elected as the Action libérale nationale candidate to the Legislative Assembly of Quebec in 1935 in the riding of Montmagny.  He was re-elected in 1936 as the Union Nationale candidate.

In 1937, he and colleagues René Chaloult, Oscar Drouin, Philippe Hamel and Adolphe Marcoux left the Union Nationale.  They founded a short-lived party that was called Parti national.  Grégoire did not run for re-election in 1939.

Death

He died on September 17, 1980.

Family
He was the father of Gilles Grégoire.

Honors

In 1934, Grégoire was made a Chevalier of the Légion d'honneur. In the 1935 New Year Honours, he was made a Commander of the Order of the British Empire.

References

1886 births
1980 deaths
Action libérale nationale MNAs
Canadian Commanders of the Order of the British Empire
Mayors of Quebec City
Lawyers in Quebec
Union Nationale (Quebec) MNAs
Chevaliers of the Légion d'honneur
Academic staff of Université Laval
Université Laval alumni